Mike Stevens (born January 24, 1953) is an American politician and a Republican member of the South Dakota House of Representatives representing District 18 since January 12, 2021. Stevens also served in the South Dakota House of Representatives from 2013 to 2019, where he was elected House Majority Whip on November 15, 2014. Stevens served as the chairman of the Judiciary Committee during his first tenure in the South Dakota House of Representatives. Stevens also served on the Yankton School Board for 21 years and was the former president of the South Dakota Trial Lawyers.

Election history

2020     Stevens was elected with 6,778 votes; Ryan Cwach was also re-elected with 5,109 votes.
2016     Stevens was re-elected with 6,296; Jean Hunhoff was re-elected with 5,393 votes and David Allen received 3,047 votes and Peter Rossiter received 2,250 votes.
2014     Stevens was re-elected with 4,604 votes; Jean Hunhoff was also elected with 3,966 votes and Terry Winter received 2,672 votes and Jay Williams received 2,336 votes.
2012 When incumbent Republican representative Nick Moser left the Legislature and left a District 18 seat open, Stevens ran in the four-way June 5, 2012, Republican primary and placed second with 710 votes; in the four-way November 6, 2012, general election, incumbent Democratic representative Bernie Hunhoff took the first seat and Stevens took the second seat with 4,657 votes (26.21%) ahead of fellow Republican nominee Thomas Stotz and Democratic nominee Charlie Gross.

References

External links
Official page at the South Dakota Legislature
 
Blackburn & Stevens Law Firm Mike's Law Firm

1953 births
Living people
Republican Party members of the South Dakota House of Representatives
People from Yankton, South Dakota
South Dakota lawyers
University of South Dakota School of Law alumni
21st-century American politicians